The Adventures of Ozzie and Harriet ran from 1952 to 1966 organized into 14 seasons. It started as a radio show and for about the first two seasons, the television show ran simultaneously with the radio show. This wholesome family sitcom features the Nelson family, consisting of Ozzie, Harriet, David, and Rick Nelson, and later on David's wife, June Blair, and Rick's wife, Kris Nelson. The earlier seasons feature a pal for Ozzie, the competitive, yet good-natured, Thorny (played by Don Defore). Later seasons also include characters Doc Williams (played by Frank Cady), Joe Randolph (played by Lyle Talbot), Clara Randolph (played by Mary Jane Croft), and Darby (played by Parley Baer).
This is a list of all episodes of The Adventures of Ozzie and Harriet.

Series overview

Episodes

Season 1 (1952–53)

Season 2 (1953–54)

Season 3 (1954–55)

Season 4 (1955–56)

Season 5 (1956–57)

Season 6 (1957–58)

Season 7 (1958–59)

Season 8 (1959–60)

Season 9 (1960–61)

Season 10 (1961–62)

Season 11 (1962–63)

Season 12 (1963–64)

Season 13 (1964–65)

Season 14 (1965–66)
Filmed in color.

External links
 
Adventures Of Ozzie & Harriet on Way Back When

Lists of American sitcom episodes